The 2001 Summer Universiade, also known as the XXI Summer Universiade, was an international multi-sport event that took place in Beijing, China, between 22 August and 1 September. A total of 6,757 athletes from 165 nations took part in 12 sports. The hosts, China, topped the medal table for the first time, with a total of 103 medals and 54 gold medals (more than twice the number of gold- medals won by the United States, in second place).

The event was also considered a rehearsal for the 2008 Beijing Olympics due to the announcement that Beijing would host the 2008 Olympic Games, which was made one month before the Opening Ceremony of the Universiade.

Venues

Chaoyang District
 Beijing Workers' Stadium — ceremonies and football (men's finals)
 Olympic Sports Center Stadium — athletics
 Ying Tung Natatorium — swimming
 Olympic Sports Center Gymnasium - volleyball (finals)
 Sino-Japanese Youth Center pool - water polo
 Beijing Chaoyang Gymnasium - volleyball

Fengtai District
 Fengtai Sports Center - volleyball, football
 Guangcai Gymnasium - volleyball
 Beijing Tennis Center — tennis

Haidian District 
  Haidian Stadium - football
 Peking University Haidian Gymnasium — table tennis
 Peking University Main Gymnasium - basketball 
 Peking University May Fourth Stadium - football
 Peking University Swimming Pool- water polo
 Peking University Health Science Center Gymnasium- volleyball
 Tsinghua University Gymnasium - basketball
 Tsinghua University Stadium - football
 Tsinghua University Diving Pool - diving
 Beijing Sport University Gymnasium - basketball
 Beijing Sport University Stadium - football
 Capital Indoor Stadium — gymnastics (artistic and rhythmic)
 Beijing Jiaotong University Gymnasium - basketball
 Beijing Forestry University Gymnasium - basketball
 Minzu University of China Gymnasium - basketball
 Beihang University Gymnasium - volleyball 
 Capital Normal University stadium - football

Xicheng District 
 Beijing Yuetan Gymnasium - judo

Shijingshan District
 Shougang Gymnasium - fencing

Dongcheng District 
 Xiannongtan Stadium- football

Sports
Events in a total of twelve sports were contested at the Universiade.
 Note: Numbers in brackets denote the number of different events held in each sport.

Obligatory sports
Rhythmic gymnastics became an obligatory sport at this edition.

 Aquatics
 
 
 
 
 
 

 
 
 Artistic gymnastics (14)
 Rhythmic gymnastics (8)

Optional

Medal table

References

 
2001
U
Summer Universiade
U
Multi-sport events in China
Sports competitions in Beijing
2000s in Beijing
August 2001 sports events in Asia
September 2001 sports events in Asia